Bjørøya is an island in the Folda sea, just south of the Namsenfjorden in the municipality of Flatanger in Trøndelag county, Norway. The island has several large peat bogs as well as a farm. Ellingråsa Lighthouse is located on the northwest part of the island. There island has had no permanent residents since the 1970s.

See also
List of islands of Norway

References

Islands of Trøndelag
Flatanger